Benvenga is an Italian surname. Notable people with the surname include:

Alex Benvenga (born 1991), Italian footballer
Carolina Benvenga (born 1990), Italian singer, actress, and television presenter

Italian-language surnames